Council of the Isles may be a reference to:
 the council of Highland chiefs and freeholders charged with the provision of advice to the medieval Lord of the Isles
 the British–Irish Council, established in 1999